The Cleansing is a studio album by John Zorn and Bill Laswell. It is the first collaborative album by the duo and was recorded in shortly after the COVID-19 lockdowns ended in 2021 and released by Tzadik Records in January 2022.  The album consists of improvised music by Zorn and Laswell that was recorded in the studio in real time with no edits or overdubs.

Reception

All About Jazz said:

Track listing
All pieces are real time improvisations
 "Brion Gysin" – 10:04
 "Aleister Crowley" – 6:52
 "Austin Osman Spare" – 6:47
 "William Burroughs" – 10:19
 "Alejandro Jodorowsky" — 8:56
 "The Cleansing" — 3:41

Personnel
 John Zorn – alto saxophone
 Bill Laswell – bass

Sound
 Scott Hull – mastering
 James Dellatacoma – recording and mix
 John Zorn and Kazunori Sugiyama – producers

References

2022 albums
John Zorn albums
Albums produced by John Zorn
Bill Laswell albums
Collaborative albums
Tzadik Records albums